Giovanni Do (before 1617 – ?1656) was a Spanish painter, active in Naples.

He was born in the town of Xàtiva, near Valencia in Spain. By 1626, Giovanni Do was in Naples, and that year he married Grazia, sister of Pacecco De Rosa; the marriage contract describes him as Spanish and states the painters Giovanni Battista Caracciolo and fellow Spaniard Jusepe de Ribera as witnesses. His only masterpiece, and firm attribution, is his gloom-stricken tenebrist ‘'Adoration of shepherds'’ for the Church of Pietà dei Turchini in Naples. The Real Academia de Bellas Artes de San Fernando in Madrid owns a beautiful Adoration of the Shepherds proved to be a versión of an unpublished original by Ribera, of similar measures, was discovered that in 2012 appeared on the Art market.

References

Artnet biography from Grove encyclopedia or Art.

External links
Jusepe de Ribera, 1591-1652, a full text exhibition catalog from The Metropolitan Museum of Art, which includes material on Giovanni Do (see index)

17th-century Italian painters
Italian male painters
Painters from Naples
Spanish Baroque painters
1650s deaths
Year of birth uncertain
People from Xàtiva
Spanish male painters